Chris McGrath may refer to:

 Chris McGrath (footballer) (Christopher Roland McGrath, born 1954), Northern Irish footballer
 Christian McGrath (born 1972), American fantasy and science fiction illustrator
 Christopher C. McGrath (1902–1986), US Congressman from New York
 Gunner McGrath (Christopher Leslie McGrath, born 1978), American musician, lead singer and guitarist of the punk rock band Much The Same